Oha Suta is the Japan children's breakfast television show. Sutajio is a loanword from English word "studio"), which originally ran from 2 April 1979 to 27 June 1986 on what is now TXN; the title of this revival, Oha Suta, comes from the portmanteau of the original Ohayō Studio.

Cast
Subaru Kimura 
Ike Nwala 
Yuki Sakurai (Maki Kota / Mighty Kou Z) 
Ryogo Matsumaru (Prince Insparkle Matsumaru-kun) 
Cyborg Warrior Iwai (Yuki Iwai) 
Masuo 
Taiiku Okazaki 
Chocolate Planet (Shohei Osada & Shun Matsuo)
Miki (Asei & Kosei) 
Sakura Inoue 
Fire Tachibana (Naoto Ikeda) 
Kaminari (Manabu Takeuchi & Takumi Ishida) 
Yamamoto Bucho (Hiroshi Yamamoto) 
Sunshine Ikezaki 
3 o'Clock Heroine (Maki Fukuda Kanade & Yumecchi)

Oha Girls
Oha Girl Apple (おはガールアップル, July 1998 - September 1998)
Oha Girl Banana (おはガールバナナ, October 1998 - March 1999)
Oha Girl Citrus (おはガールシトラス, April 1999 - March 2000)
Oha Girl Cherry (おはガールチェリー, April 1999 - March 2000)
Oha Girl Grape (おはガールグレープ, April 2001 - March 2002)
Oha Girl Fruitpunch (おはガールフルーツポンチ, April 2002 - March 2003)
Oha Girl Starfruit (おはガールスターフルーツ, April 2003 - March 2004)
Oha Girl Starfruit 2 (おはガールスターフルー2, April 2004 - March 2005)
Oha Girl Candy Mint (おはガールキャンディミント, April 2005 - March 2007)
Oha Girl 2007-2008 (おはガール, April 2007 - March 2008)
Oha Girl 2008-2009 (おはガール, April 2008 - March 2009)
Oha Girl 2009-2010 (おはガール, April 2009 - March 2010)
Oha Girl Maple (おはガールメープル, April 2010 - March 2012)
Oha Girl Chu! Chu! Chu! (おはガールちゅ！ちゅ！ちゅ！, April 2012 - March 2014)
Oha Girl 2016 - 2017 (おはガール, April 2016 - September 2017) 
Oha Girl 2017 - 2019 (おはガール, October 2017 - September 2019) 
Oha Girl from Girls² (おはガール from Girls², April 2019 – October 2021) 
Oha Girl from Lucky² (おはガール from Lucky², October 2021 – March 2022)
Shin Oha Girl 2022 (シン.おはガール, April 2022 – Present)

External links

Japanese children's television series
1990s Japanese television series
2000s Japanese television series
2010s Japanese television series
2020s Japanese television series
TV Tokyo original programming